Anne Frank Inspire Academy (AFIA) is a public K-12 charter school in San Antonio, operated by Braination (John H. Wood Jr. Public Charter District).

The original campus, Bandera Road, has grades K-12. It is in proximity to Helotes and was named after Anne Frank. The school also has a K-8 campus, NW Military.

History
It opened in 2014 with 150 middle school students. 220 applications for admission were submitted to the school by April 2013. It was the first non-disciplinary charter school operated by the district.  The school had a cost of $5.5 million; funds used to establish the school originated in savings amassed from government funds for the disciplinary schools, and the establishment used almost all of the district's savings. Braination closed one of its existing schools, located in a detention center in Post, Texas, and gave its state campus identification number to Frank because its charter limited it to operating six schools. In 2014 the school had seven teachers, what it called "facilitators", with all but one having prior significant teaching experience.

Its Bandera Road elementary school facility and 9th grade were scheduled to open in fall 2015.

Due to Bandera Road becoming at capacity, the second campus, NW military, opened in 2021 with grades K-4, with each new grade opening each subsequent year until it has K-8. The previous entity in that building was another charter school that moved elsewhere.

Student body
Admission is by lottery;  the majority of the students resided in the Northside Independent School District (NISD), as the school is within the district's territory.  the school had 400 students.

Campuses
The Bandera Road facility, designed by RVK Architects, has  of space. The school was designed to have extracurricular activities and includes a coffeeshop, a nature trail, a pond, and a treehouse. Pete Nelson, a treehouse builder from Portland, Oregon, built the treehouse.

Curriculum and operations
Teachers are known as "facilitators" at this school. Learning is self-directed, with students meeting advisors and attending teacher-directed seminars each morning before starting work. Students may engage in tutoring, work in small groups, or work by themselves. Therefore the school lacks a bell schedule, as well as desks and hallways seen in traditional middle schools. Students described the movement throughout the school as "controlled chaos".

Athletics
The school planned to have art, computer, and robotics elective courses. In 2014 the school had no plans to have athletics. The school does have informal athletic programs operated as clubs.

See also
 Education in San Antonio

References

Further reading

External links
 
 Anne Frank Inspire Academy - Turner Construction
 Anne Frank Inspire Awards

2014 establishments in Texas
Educational institutions established in 2014
High schools in San Antonio
Schools in San Antonio
Charter K-12 schools in Texas
Anne Frank